Antietam is an unincorporated community and census-designated place in Washington County, Maryland, United States. Its population was 89 as of the 2010 census. It is the site of Antietam Iron Furnace Site and Antietam Village, added to the National Register of Historic Places in 1975.

Geography 

Demographics

References 

Unincorporated communities in Washington County, Maryland
Unincorporated communities in Maryland
Census-designated places in Washington County, Maryland
Census-designated places in Maryland